Osea Vakatalesau (born 15 January 1986) is a Fijian footballer who plays for Nadroga and the Fiji national team.

International career
Nicknamed Ozzy, he participated in South Pacific Games 2007 (where he was the tournament's top goalscorer with 10 goals) and the 2010 FIFA World Cup qualification tournament where he scored numerous goals for his country. He was the joint top goalscorer of the 2010 FIFA World Cup qualifying campaign with 12 goals along with Burkina Faso striker Moumouni Dagano.

Career statistics

International goals

Honours
League Championship (districts): 2006
Inter-District Championship: 2005, 2007
Battle of the Giants: 2007
Fiji Cup: 2007

References

External links

1986 births
Amicale F.C. players
Expatriate footballers in Vanuatu
Living people
I-Taukei Fijian people
Fijian footballers
Fiji international footballers
YoungHeart Manawatu players
Hekari United players
Lautoka F.C. players
Ba F.C. players
2008 OFC Nations Cup players
2012 OFC Nations Cup players
Fijian expatriate footballers
Fijian expatriate sportspeople in New Zealand
Expatriate association footballers in New Zealand
Expatriate footballers in Papua New Guinea
Association football forwards
Fijian expatriate sportspeople in Papua New Guinea